Vaz is a Portuguese language surname.

It may refer to:

 Ann-Marie Vaz (born 1966), Jamaican politician
 Armindo Vaz d'Almeida, former Prime Minister of São Tomé and Príncipe
 Camillo Vaz (born 1975), French football manager
 Carlos Vaz Ferreira, Uruguayan philosopher
 Carta de Pero Vaz de Caminha, Brazilian diarist
 Claudio Ibrahim Vaz Leal,  Brazilian footballer
 Damião Vaz d'Almeida, former Prime Minister of São Tomé and Príncipe
 Daryl Vaz, Jamaican politician
 Douglas Vaz (died 2019), Jamaican politician
 Gail Vaz-Oxlade, Canadian writer and TV personality 
Herkley Vaz, Jamaican footballer 
 João Vaz Corte-Real, Portuguese explorer
 João Vaz, Portuguese painter
 José Mário Vaz, former President of Guinea-Bissau
 Joseph Vaz, 17th century Sri Lankan missionary
 Keith Vaz, British politician and former Labour MP
 Luis Vaz de Camoes, Portuguese poet
 Luís Vaz Pereira Pinto Guedes, Portuguese military commander
 María Eugenia Vaz Ferreira, Uruguayan teacher and poet
 Pêro Vaz de Caminha, 15th century Portuguese knight
 Ricardo Vaz Tê, Portuguese footballer
 Tristão Vaz Teixeira, Portuguese navigator and explorer
 Valdomiro Vaz Franco, Brazilian footballer 
 Valerie Vaz, British politician and Labour MP
 Zeferino Vaz, Brazilian educator
 Lançados (Portuguese Africans) settlers:
 Bibiana Vaz, seventeenth century slave-trader from Cacheu, Guinea-Bissau.

Surnames
Portuguese-language surnames
Surnames of Portuguese origin
Surnames of Indian origin